Little Chalfont is a village and civil parish in south-east Buckinghamshire, England. It is one of a group of villages known collectively as The Chalfonts, which also comprises Chalfont St Giles and Chalfont St Peter.

History
Little Chalfont is a 20th-century creation triggered by the coming of the Metropolitan Railway.  A station called Chalfont Road was opened in 1889 at the northernmost point of Chalfont St Giles Parish where the parishes of Amersham, Chenies, and Chalfont St Giles met.  At that time, the area was remote from the centres of the villages and towns, and consisted of isolated farms and cottages, and did not have a specific name.

The coming of the railway eventually brought local housing development, and a community developed around the station, which was renamed Chalfont & Latimer station in 1915, a name which it retains today.

The first appearance of the name Little Chalfont is in the minutes of the Chalfont St Giles Parish Council on 15 January 1925, when, at the request of the inhabitants, it was agreed that the group of houses near the station should be named Little Chalfont instead of "Chalfont Road Village". For many years, Little Chalfont was split mainly in the Amersham Town Council area, and partly in Chalfont St Giles parish. Following a period of campaigning by local residents, the village was awarded separate Parish status in 2007. Most of the new Parish came from Amersham, but a small part (in area, rather larger in population) of Chalfont St Giles was also included.

Transport
Little Chalfont is served by Chalfont & Latimer station, on the Metropolitan line of the London Underground and the London to Aylesbury Line of Chiltern Railways. There are also bus services to Amersham, Chesham and other surrounding towns and villages.

Education
There are three schools in Little Chalfont: two primary schools (Little Chalfont Primary School, and Chalfont Valley E-ACT Primary Academy (formerly Bell Lane Primary School)), and Dr Challoner's High School - a girls' grammar school.

Little Chalfont Community Library was originally part of the Buckinghamshire County Library Service but is now run as a community library by local volunteers since 2007. It is one of the most successful community libraries in England.

Community

Little Chalfont Farmers Market was launched in September 2009 with the support of the Parish Council and local regeneration groups.  The Farmers Market takes place in the Village Hall car park on the second Saturday of each month.

 Little Chalfont Nature Park  is a 4.6 acre Nature Park with rare MG5 grassland / wildflower meadow and semi-natural woodland. It was purchased for and by the community and opened on 1 June 2016. It is freely open to visitors all year round from dawn until dusk.

Little Chalfont Community Association  is active and organises the Annual Village Day.

Landmarks
Beel House is a  Grade II listed 16th-century house on the edge of Little Chalfont. Originally owned by the Duke of Buckingham. It was the home of Mary Pennington whose daughter Gulielma Springett married William Penn, founder of Pennsylvania. Later residents include Dirk Bogarde, Ozzy Osbourne, and Robert Kilroy-Silk.

Religion
Little Chalfont is part of the Church of England parish of Chenies and Little Chalfont. In 1987, it joined with the neighbouring parishes of Latimer and Flaunden to form the Chenies Benefice. The parish church of St George's is on White Lion Road.

It was opened in 1964, having been built on land bought from the Beel House estate.

Little Chalfont Methodist Church is on Chalfont Avenue. The original church building was opened in 1959. After the church was damaged by fire in 1993, the current church building was opened in 1996.

Economy
Little Chalfont is home to two industrial laboratories and an office development, part of GE Healthcare, originally the Radiochemical Centre, and then Amersham International. Recently, the building housing GE Healthcare, was acquired by Cytiva, rebranding the building.

References

"A History of Little Chalfont" Ivor White 1993 published by The Little Chalfont Rural Preservation Society (now the Little Chalfont Community Association), Bucks, England.

External links 

 Little Chalfont Parish Council website
 Little Chalfont Village website
 Little Chalfont Community Library website
 Little Chalfont Nature Park website
 Pictures of Little Chalfont
 Little Chalfont Farmers Market

Villages in Buckinghamshire
Civil parishes in Buckinghamshire